The men's 4 x 100 metres relay at the 2017 World Para Athletics Championships was held at the Olympic Stadium in London from 14–23 July.

Medalists

Events listed in pink were contested but no medals were awarded.

See also
List of IPC world records in athletics

References

4 x 400 metres relay
2017 in men's athletics
4 × 100 metres relay at the World Para Athletics Championships